is a railway station on the Kagoshima Main Line operated by JR Kyushu in Arao, Kumamoto Prefecture, Japan.

Lines 
Both local and rapid services on the line stop at the station.

Layout 
The station consists of two island platforms serving four tracks with passing loops to the north and south. The station building is wooden structure of traditional Japanese design with a tiled roof. It houses a staffed ticket window (with a Midori no Madoguchi facility) and a waiting area. Access to the island platforms is by means of a footbridge.

Adjacent stations

History
Japanese Government Railways (JGR) opened the station with the name  on 1 November 1912 as an additional station on the existing track of the Kagoshima Main Line. On 15 June 1943, the station name was changed to Arao. With the privatization of Japanese National Railways (JNR), the successor of JGR, on 1 April 1987, JR Kyushu took over control of the station.

Passenger statistics
In fiscal 2016, the station was used by an average of 1,172 passengers daily (boarding passengers only), and it ranked 143rd among the busiest stations of JR Kyushu.

References

External links
Arao Station (JR Kyushu)

Railway stations in Kumamoto Prefecture
Railway stations in Japan opened in 1912